Lady Alice Falls is a tall waterfall in Fiordland, New Zealand. It drops either 656 or 919 feet (200 or 280 m). The falls are formed by a mountain stream dropping out of a hanging valley down to Doubtful Sound, one kilometre inside Deep Cove.

The falls should not be confused with the Alice Falls, further north in Fiordland, which flow into George Sound.

Notes

Waterfalls of Fiordland
Cascade waterfalls